SiTech, also known as Xinte Auto, is a Chinese automobile manufacturer headquartered in Changchun, China,  that specializes in producing electric vehicles. Gyon is a luxury sub-division of SiTech.

History
SiTech was founded in 2018, and is based in Changchun. SiTech's motto is "Beyond Technology. Together Living Tomorrow." In 2018, SiTech built a factory and operating plant in Silicon Valley. The built a factory in China in 2019, which cost ¥7 billion.

SiTech's first vehicle was the DEV1, which came out in 2018. It costs 139,900 to 164,900 yuan, and has a charging time of 40 minutes for 80% full battery. It includes a 10-inch touch screen and an 8-inch instrument panel, and a 350 kilometer range. It has been rated A0+ level intelligent.

The MEV was the company's second vehicle, which came out in 2020. Its dimensions are 4632 mm/1790 mm/1500 mm, with a wheelbase of 2652 mm, and a weight of 1463 kg. It has a range of 402 km, and is powered by a 51 kWh battery. The MEV comes in the 60 edition, 70 edition, 80 edition, 90 edition, and the 100 edition. The MEV100 is a model jointly manufactured by SiTech and FAW. The SiTech MEV100 is actually based on the Bestune B30 by FAW and is essentially the rebadged electric variant with the overall design is based on the B30.

SiTech also produced the GEV1. The SiTech GEV1 is essentially a variant of the DEV1.

SiTech's final vehicle launched in 2020 was the AEVS, which is a rebadged Kandi K27.

Vehicles

Current models
SiTech currently has three production vehicles.

Sales

SiTech sold 300,000 units from 2019 to 2020.

References

Car brands
Car manufacturers of China
Chinese brands